Bloodthirsty Butchers is a 1970 horror film directed by Andy Milligan and starring Michael Cox, Linda Driver, Jane Helay, and Bernard Kaler. It is an adaptation of the notorious story of Sweeney Todd. The film was released as a double feature with Torture Dungeon.

Plot 

An updated version of the Sweeney Todd legend, this melodrama tells the tale of a murderous barber, Sweeney Todd, who supplies raw meat for his neighbor, Mrs. Lovett, who runs a pie shop. Amid the resulting carnage is a romantic sub-plot, although the film focuses mainly on the gore.

Cast
 Annabella Wood as Johanna
 Berwick Kaler as Tobias Ragg
 Jane Helay as Mrs. Lovett
 John Miranda as Sweeney Todd

Release
Bloodthirsty Butchers premiered on 23 January 1970 and was re-released in a special screening of the Milligan Mania as part of the Cinedelphia Film Festival on 10 April 2015 over Exhumed Films.

Home media
Bloodthirsty Butchers was first released on VHS in the mid 1980s by the defunct video company Midnight Video. The film was released for the first time on DVD by Films Around The World Inc. on January 1, 2013. The company would re-released the film on August 28, 2018.

Reception

TV Guide rated the film one out of four stars, calling it a "gory and typically cheap retelling of the Sweeney Todd legend".

References

External links 
 
 
 
 

1970 films
1970s exploitation films
1970 independent films
1970 horror films
American exploitation films
American independent films
American serial killer films
American slasher films
American splatter films
Films set in London
Sweeney Todd
Films about cannibalism
1970s English-language films
Films directed by Andy Milligan
1970s American films